France has debuted in the Jeux sans frontières at the first contest in 1965 and participated in all, but 5 years, missing only the 1969 and dropping out between 1993 and 1996. France won three times the International Finals, immediately the first one with Saint-Amand-les-Eaux together with Belgian Ciney in a draw in 1965. Also won in 1975 and last time at home soil in 1979.

Participation in the International Finals

Notes

References

Jeux sans frontières